"Heartbreak Town" is a song written by Darrell Scott, and recorded by American country music group Dixie Chicks.  It was released in June 2001 as the seventh single from the album Fly.

Content  
The song tells the story of a young family's disappointment upon moving to Nashville.

History
Darrell Scott wrote and recorded "Heartbreak Town" for his 1997 album Aloha from Nashville.

The song peaked at number 23 on the U.S. country charts.  It also reached number 21 on the Bubbling Under Hot 100 Singles. The Dixie Chicks performed the song on their 2001 Fly Tour and it was featured on the 2010 greatest hits album The Essential Dixie Chicks.

Pleased with the song's success, the Dixie Chicks later covered Scott's "Long Time Gone" for their 2002 album Home.

Chart performance

References

Song recordings produced by Blake Chancey
Song recordings produced by Paul Worley
The Chicks songs
2001 singles
Songs written by Darrell Scott
Monument Records singles
1987 songs